Isabelle Mary Geraldine Westbury (born 8 March 1990) is a sports writer, broadcaster, lawyer and former cricketer. As a cricketer, she played as a right-arm off break bowler, playing for Somerset and Middlesex, as well as being part of the Western Storm squad in 2016. She captained Middlesex for two seasons, in 2015 and 2016. She also appeared in one One Day International for the Netherlands in 2005, whilst attending school in the country.

She was President of the Oxford Union in 2011–12. She finished playing cricket in 2017, and has since worked as a print and broadcast journalist, specialising in cricket, law and politics, writing for The Daily Telegraph and broadcasting for the BBC. She is also a financial crime lawyer.

Early life
Born in Hammersmith, London, Westbury experienced a nomadic childhood, living in Mongolia, Malaysia, Easter Island and Syria before arriving in the Netherlands. She attended The British School in the Netherlands from 2001 to 2006. It was in the Netherlands that she first started playing cricket, after being prevented from playing club football alongside boys beyond the age of 13, at the "very traditional club" near her house. 

Westbury studied for an undergraduate degree in Physiology at Hertford College, Oxford, graduating in 2013. In addition to her cricket career, she also played hockey for Oxford, achieving her Blue by playing in the Varsity Hockey Match against Cambridge in March 2010. In 2011, she was elected as President of the Oxford Union, having earlier served as the society's secretary, and has been described as "the most engaging president that the Oxford Union has had in years".

Cricket career

The Netherlands
At the age of thirteen, Westbury began to play boys cricket for The Hague Cricket Club, and at the age of fourteen she was picked for the national side, making her first appearance at the 2004 European Under-21 Championships. Playing as wicket-keeper, she claimed one catch and then scored 15 not out batting from number nine as Ireland won by 98 runs. In the Netherlands' second match of the competition, she moved down to number eleven, and remained unbeaten without scoring when England secured a 219-run victory with over 10 overs remaining. Another loss in the final match of the competition ensured that the Netherlands finished bottom of the table — Westbury scored five runs as no Dutch batter managed to reach double figures against Scotland.

In 2005, aged 15, Westbury represented the senior Netherlands side for the first time during the 2005 European Championship in Wales. Unlike her appearances for the Under-21s, which she made as wicket-keeper, Westbury played as a bowler for the duration of the tournament, batting in the lower order. She claimed three wickets during the tournament at an average of 46.66. Only required to bat twice, she scored 1 and 0*, made during losses against England Development Squad and Ireland respectively.

The 2006 European Under-21 Championships saw Westbury reprise her role as wicket-keeper batter for the youth side. The Netherlands were much improved from the 2004 tournament; after a heavy loss to England in a warm-up match, the Netherlands won their final match to finish runners-up behind England. She scored 30 in the second match, a loss to Ireland, as only herself and Lotte Egging reached double figures for the Netherlands. She made her highest total for the Under-21s in the final match of the competition, scoring 75 before being run out as the Netherlands reached 180 off their 50 overs, and then bowled Scotland out, achieving a 95 run victory. She finished the competition as the leading run-scorer and won the Player of the Tournament for her achievements.

England

Westbury started at Millfield School in Street, Somerset in 2006 on a sports scholarship. She joined Somerset for the 2007 County Championship. After her first match, in which she batted at number nine, and was 19 not out at the close of the innings, she opened the innings for the county for the remainder of the season. She enjoyed mixed success in the role, and finished the season with a batting average of 19.75, the third-best for Somerset.

Remaining with Somerset in 2008, she claimed her first wicket for the county during their first match of the season, having Surrey opener Ebony-Jewel Rainford-Brent caught. She appeared in the Super Fours—a competition in which the England selectors place the 48 leading players into four teams—for the first time in 2008, representing the Diamonds in both the 50-over and 20-over forms of the game. She bowled economically in the Twenty20 semi-final, helping to limit the Sapphires to 123, which Diamonds chased down successfully with a ball to spare. She remained economical in the final, but despite restricting the Rubies to 110, Diamonds could only reach 106 in their reply. In three 50-over Super Fours matches, she was less effective; her only wicket coming in the first match. Returning to the County Championship, Westbury dropped down into the lower order batting, while at the same time seeing her workload with the ball increasing. Somerset were rewarded in the match against Lancashire when she claimed five-wickets in the innings for the first time to set up a 132 run win. She continued her form in the following match, claiming four wickets against Warwickshire, conceding only four runs. She finished the season as Somerset's leading wicket-taker, claiming her twelve wickets at an average of 6.41. Westbury also competed in the Junior Super Fours—for 16- to 19-year-old female cricketers—towards the end of the 2008 season. Appearing for Junior Emeralds, she improved as the tournament progressed, following up scores of 18 and 27 with the tournament's highest score, 89, in the final match. She finished as the competition's second-highest run-scorer.

The 2009 County Championship campaign saw Westbury's form dip from the previous season. Playing in five of Somerset's ten matches, she scored 18 runs at an average under four, and her three wickets came at 38.66. Her performances in the Junior Super Fours, however, continued to improve with both bat and ball. Named as captain of the Junior Emeralds, Westbury led by example in the opening match, taking three wickets and limiting the Rubies to 21 runs off her eight overs, and then top-scoring with 37 for her side in their successful chase. She bowled even more economically in the following match, conceding 12 runs off 10 overs, once again claiming three wickets. Opening the batting for the Emeralds in their reply—as she had done in the first match—she made 46 runs, sharing a partnership of 102 with fellow opener Beth MacGregor to help set up a seven wicket victory. The Emerald's final match saw the Sapphires score more effectively off her bowling, totalling 30 runs from her 10 overs, but Westbury replied with an unbeaten century to propel her side to another seven wicket win. Her 187 runs and 7 wickets ensured she finished the tournament as the most prolific batter and bowler, as the Emeralds won after remaining undefeated.

In January 2010, Westbury was named as part of the England Academy squad for the High Performance Camp in Bangalore, India. Westbury joined Middlesex in 2013, and was made captain the following year. In 2016, she signed for the Western Storm in the inaugural Kia Super League, but did not play a game.

Legal career
Westbury was admitted as a solicitor on 17 September 2018, and was then working for the Royal Air Force. She has a specialism in criminal law.

References

External links
 
 

1990 births
Living people
Cricketers from Greater London
Dutch women cricketers
Netherlands women One Day International cricketers
Somerset women cricketers
Middlesex women cricketers
Western Storm cricketers
Alumni of Hertford College, Oxford
Presidents of the Oxford Union
People educated at Millfield